Jay Wilsey (February 6, 1896 – October 25, 1961) was an American film actor (born Wilbert Jay Wilsey). He appeared in nearly 100 films between 1924 and 1944. He starred in a series of very low-budget westerns in the 1920s and 1930s, billed as Buffalo Bill Jr. 

Born in St. Francisville, Missouri, Wilsey rode in Wild West shows and rodeos before he became an actor. His first film was Rarin' to Go (1924). Wilsey's career as an actor diminished as sound films increased in popularity, causing him to become a stunt performer. A January 29, 1940, newspaper article reported that he had performed 6,000 stunts up to that time.

Wilsey was married to actress Jeanette Boutelle.

Selected filmography

 Rarin' to Go (1924) - Bill Dillon
 Fast and Fearless (1924) - Lightning Bill Lewis
 Hard Hittin' Hamilton (1924) - Bill Hamilton
 Bringin' Home the Bacon (1924) - Bill Winton
 Thundering Romance (1924) - Lightning Bill
 Full Speed (1925)
 On the Go (1925) - Bill Drake
 Double Action Daniels (1925) - Double Action Daniels
 Quicker'n Lightnin''' (1925) - Quicker'n Lightnin'
 The Desert Demon (1925) - Bill Davis
 The Saddle Cyclone (1925) - Bill Demming
 A Streak of Luck (1925) - Billy Burton
 The Roaring Rider (1926) - Buffalo Bill Jr.
 Hoodoo Ranch (1926)
 Trumpin' Trouble (1926) - Bill Lawson
 Coming an' Going (1926) - Bill Martin
 Deuce High (1926) - Ted Crawford
 Rawhide (1926) - Rawhide Rawlins
 Speedy Spurs (1926) - Bill Clark
 The Bonanza Buckaroo (1926) - Bill Merritt
 Bad Man's Bluff (1926) - Zane Castleton
 The Galloping Gobs (1927) - Bill Corbitt
 The Ridin' Rowdy (1927) - Bill Gibson
 Pals in Peril (1927) - Bill Gordon
 The Interferin' Gent (1927) - Bill Stannard
 The Obligin' Buckaroo (1927) - Bill Murray
 Roarin' Broncs (1927) - Bill Morris
 The Ballyhoo Buster (1928) - Bob Warner
 The Valley of Hunted Men (1928) - Tom Mallory
 A Final Reckoning (1928) - Captain Wilson
 The Pirate of Panama (1929) - Karl
 Thundering Thompson (1929) - Cowhand (uncredited)
 Bar-L Ranch (1930) - Bob Tyler
 Beyond the Rio Grande (1930) - Bill
 The Cheyenne Kid (1930) - Buck Allen / The Cheyenne Kid
 Way Out West (1930) - Hank
 Beyond the Law (1930) - Henchman (uncredited)
 The Utah Kid (1930) - Deputy (uncredited)
 South of Sonora (1930) - Bill Tracy
 Westward Bound (1930) - Bob Lansing
 Trails of the Golden West (1931)
 The Mystery Trooper (1931) - Tall Henchman (uncredited)
 Pueblo Terror (1931) - Bill Sommers
 A Holy Terror (1931) - Cowboy (uncredited)
 Riders of the Golden Gulch (1932)
 Ridin' for Justice (1932) - Barfly (uncredited)
 The Texan (1932) - Bill Rust
 Dynamite Denny (1932) - 'Dynamite' Denny
 Hidden Gold (1932) - Cowhand (uncredited)
 The Lost Special (1932, Serial) - Forest Station Agent [Ch. 2] (uncredited)
 Terror Trail (1933) - Prisoner (uncredited)
 The Thrill Hunter (1933) - Pilot (uncredited)
 The Fighting Cowboy (1933) - Bill Carson
 Deadwood Pass (1933) - Deputy
 Rusty Rides Alone (1933) - Luke Quillan (uncredited)
 Strange People (1933) - Traveller (uncredited)
 Trails of Adventure (1933) - Bill Merritt
 The Whirlwind Rider (1934) - Bill Reed
 Lighting Bill (1934) - Bill
 Wheels of Destiny (1934) - Bill Collins
 Riding Speed (1934) - Steve
 Adventures of Texas Jack (1934) - Bill Mayberry
 Riding Speed (1934) - Buck Cartwright
 The Lawless Frontier (1934) - 2nd Zanti Henchman
 'Neath the Arizona Skies (1934) - Jim Moore
 Texas Terror (1935) - Blackie Martin
 The Phantom Empire (1935, Serial) - Thunder Guard (uncredited)
 Five Bad Men (1935) - Bad Man #1
 Rainbow Valley (1935) - Butch Galt
 Princess O'Hara (1935) - Mounted Policeman (uncredited)
 The Miracle Rider (1935, Serial) - Daniel Boone [Ch. 1] / Henchman [Ch. 11] (uncredited)
 The Roaring West (1935, Serial) - Cowhand Slim (uncredited)
 Powdersmoke Range (1935) - Tex Malcolm
 Three Kids and a Queen (1935) - Cop (uncredited)
 The Fire-Trap (1935) - Henchman (uncredited)
 Red River Valley (1936) - Construction Worker (uncredited)
 Heroes of the Range (1936) - Deputy (uncredited)
 Avenging Waters (1936) - Fence Foreman (uncredited)
 The Phantom Rider (1936, Serial) - Deputy Tom (Ch's 6, 8) (uncredited)
 Oh, Susanna! (1936) - Sage City Deputy (uncredited)
 Rio Grande Ranger (1936) - Texas Ranger (uncredited)
 Ranger Courage (1937) - Ranger Lieutenant Caps
 Way Out West (1937) - Barfly (uncredited)
 Law of the Ranger (1937) - Ranger Lieutenant Wells (uncredited)
 Forlorn River (1937) - Blaine Cowhand (uncredited)
 Wild West Days (1937, Serial) - Henchman / Ranch Hand / Townsman (uncredited)
 The Rangers Step In (1937) - Texas Ranger Capt. Thomas
 Rough Riders' Round-up (1939) - Barfly (uncredited)
 Blue Montana Skies (1939) - Mallew (uncredited)
 Pioneers of the Frontier (1940) - Henchman (uncredited)
 The Lone Rider Rides On (1941) - Henchman Bart
 The Lone Rider Crosses the Rio (1941) - Henchman Bart
 The Lone Rider in Ghost Town (1941) - Cowboy (uncredited)
 Lawless Plainsmen (1942) - Slim - Cowhand (uncredited)
 Frontier Fury (1943) - Stagecoach Shotgun (uncredited)
 The Dancing Masters (1943) - Stage Driver (uncredited)
 The Last Horseman (1944) - Henchman (uncredited)
 Big Jim McLain'' (1952) - Mr. Whalen (uncredited)

References

External links

 

1896 births
1961 deaths
American male film actors
American male silent film actors
Male actors from Missouri
Male Western (genre) film actors
20th-century American male actors